Howden Clough railway station served the town of Howden Clough, West Riding of Yorkshire, England, from 1866 to 1952 on the Batley to Adwalton Junction Line.

History 
The station was opened on 1 November 1866 by the Great Northern Railway.  It was known as Howden Clough for Birstall in the LNER timetable in 1933, in the handbook of stations in 1938 and in Bradshaw until the station's closure. It closed on 1 December 1952. The nearby viaduct was demolished in 1972.

References

External links 

Disused railway stations in West Yorkshire
Former Great Northern Railway stations
Railway stations in Great Britain opened in 1866
Railway stations in Great Britain closed in 1952
1866 establishments in England
1952 disestablishments in England